Pellakur is a village and a Mandal in Tirupati district in the state of Andhra Pradesh in India.

Geography 
It has an average elevation of 41 meters (137 feet).
Pellakuru is located in between Naidupet and Sri Kalahasthi.

References 

Villages in Nellore district